The 1965 Yale Bulldogs football team represented Yale University in the 1965 NCAA University Division football season.  The Bulldogs were led by first-year head coach Carmen Cozza, played their home games at the Yale Bowl and finished fifth in the Ivy League with a 3–4 record, 3–6 overall.

Schedule

References

Yale
Yale Bulldogs football seasons
Yale Bulldogs football